The 1985 Monte Carlo Open, also known by its sponsored name Jacomo Monte Carlo Open, was a men's tennis tournament played on outdoor clay courts at the Monte Carlo Country Club in Roquebrune-Cap-Martin, France that was part of the 1985 Nabisco Grand Prix. It was the 79th edition of the tournament and was held from 1 April until 7 April 1985. First-seeded Ivan Lendl won the singles title and earned $58,000 first-prize money. On the final Sunday he had to finish his semifinal again defending champion Henrik Sundström before defeating Mats Wilander in a -hour final.

Finals

Singles
 Ivan Lendl defeated  Mats Wilander, 6–1, 6–3, 4–6, 6–4
 It was Lendl's 2nd singles title of the year and the 44th of his career.

Doubles
 Pavel Složil /  Tomáš Šmíd defeated  Shlomo Glickstein /  Shahar Perkiss, 6–2, 6–3

References

External links
 
 ATP tournament profile
 ITF tournament edition details

Monte Carlo Open
Monte-Carlo Masters
1985 in Monégasque sport
Monte